Vadim Vyacheslavovich Garanin (born 29 November 1970) is a Russian football coach and a former player. He is the manager of FC Yenisey Krasnoyarsk.

Coaching career
On 20 June 2022, Garanin was appointed head coach of Russian Premier League club PFC Sochi. As Garanin did not possess the mandatory UEFA Pro Licence, his assistant Aleksandr Tochilin was formally registered with the league as head coach. On 25 December 2022, Garanin was dismissed and replaced by Kurban Berdyev.

References

External links
 

1970 births
Footballers from Moscow
Living people
Russian footballers
Association football goalkeepers
Russian football managers
FC Yenisey Krasnoyarsk managers
PFC Sochi managers
Russian Premier League managers